Roman Böer (born 9 June 1974), better known as DJ Tocadisco, formerly Tocadisco (Spanish for "turntable"), is a German DJ and record producer.

Biography
Born in Berlin, but grew up as the son of the photographer and media designer Gerry Böer in Mönchengladbach, where he also regularly hangs at the club "Die Nacht" ("the night").

In 1996, Tocadisco began his professional career as a DJ at Club Unique in Düsseldorf. The club was elected as the "best club in town" during his stint by the magazine Prinz. In 2000 Tocadisco moved to Cologne and taught there be a studio.

He produced several remixes for different record companies. The best-known case was "Lifetimes" by Slam. His mix was chosen as one of the 12 best remixes of 2001 by the readers of the magazine Groove. In October 2003, he signed a contract with the German record company Superstar Recordings. His first single under this label was "Nobody (Likes the Records That I Play)". It reached number 39 in the German charts. In 2005, Tocadisco was chosen by the magazine Raveline as one of the best newcomers of 2004. Tocadisco's remix of Mylo's In My Arms became one of the most played dance tracks of the year. This was followed by his second single "You're No Good for Me" 'and then the double single Music Loud / Crazy Cursor.

Tocadisco published a series of club EP's under the pseudonym: "AC / OT" courtesy of Superstar Recordings, In 2006, Tocadisco remixed a track by Michael Cretu's project "Enigma - Eppur si muove" of Enigma's latest album A Posteriori.

His remix for The Egg's "Walking Away" was chosen by Citroën for the advertising campaign for the C4 hatchback. Furthermore, David Guetta took the instrumental and mixed it with one of his songs, "Love Don't Let Me Go". This bootleg version became "David Guetta vs. The Egg" - "Love Don't Let Me Go (Walking Away)", reaching No. 3 on the UK Singles Chart.

On 25 January 2008, his first album Solo was released. In August of the same year, the song "Tomorrow Can Wait" featuring David Guetta and Chris Willis was released to some success.

He has produced with New Order, Tiga, David Guetta, Kelis, Fatboy Slim, Robin Schulz, Steve Angello, Axwell, Armin van Buuren and many more music producers and writers.

On September 18, 2009, his second album, TOCA 128.0 FM, appeared on the German dance label, Superstar Recordings.

2011 saw the single "Tequila Sunrise", which was published in cooperation with the Dutch producer Afrojack.

Discography

Remixes
Laidback Luke, Steve Aoki & Lil Jon - Turbulence (Tocadisco Remix)
Wippenberg - Pong (Tocadisco Remix)
A'Studio - SOS (Tocadisco Remix)
Armin Van Buuren featuring Adam Young - Youtopia (Tocadisco Remix)
The Egg - Walking Away (Tocadisco Remix)
Axwell & Sebastian Ingrosso - Together (Tocadisco Remix)
M.A.N.D.Y - Body Language (Tocadisco Remix)
The Crystal Method - Bones Theme (Tocadisco Remix)

Singles and remixes
Look Of Today (Tocadisco Remix)
Enigma - Look Of Today (Tocadisco Remix) (CDr, Single, Unofficial)	EMI	 1999	
 	
Fantasy (El Tocadisco's Virgin Mary Mix) (as El Tocadisco)
Studio 69 feat. Karl Frierson - Fantasy ◄ (2 versions)	Air	 2000	
 	
Do You Want Me? (El Tocadiso's Las Palmas Mix) (as El Tocadisco)
Studio 69 Feat. Karl Frierson - Do You Want Me? ◄ (2 versions)	Air, Air	 2001	
 	
Lifetimes (Konigswasser Mix By El Tocadisco) (as El Tocadisco)
Slam - Lifetimes (12")	Zomba Records	 2001	
 	
Gotta Get Thru This (El Tocadisco's and 3 more...
Daniel Bedingfield - Gotta Get Thru This (Remixes) ◄ (2 versions)	Jive	 2001	
 	
El Arbi (Tocadisco's Mix)
Air Libre - El Arbi ◄ (2 versions)	Air, Air	 2001	
 	
Lifetimes (Königswasser Mix By El Tocadisco) (as El Tocadisco)
Various - Kontor - Top Of The Clubs Volume 13 (2xCD, Comp, Mixed)	Polystar (3)	 2001	
 	
Soca Dance (El Tocadisco's Rework) (as El Tocadisco)
Bruce Wayne - Soca Dance (12")	Tasted	 2001	
 	
Promised Land (Toca Disco Remix) (as Toca Disco)
Studio 69 Feat. Karl Frierson - Promised Land ◄ (2 versions)	Air	 2002	
 	
L.o.v.e. (El Tocadisco Beat On The Funk Mix) (as El Tocadisco) and 2 more...
Honey Bunch - L.O.V.E. (Makin' Love In My Car) (12")	BMG	 2002	
 	
OOO La La La (Tocadisco Remix)
Justine Earp - OOO La La La (Tocadisco Remix) (12")	House Master Records	 2002	
 	
Promised Land (Toca Disco Remix) (as El Tocadisco)
DJ Antoine - Mainstation 2002 - Housesession (CD, Comp, Mixed)	Muve Recordings	 2002	
 	
Soca Dance (Tocadisco Rework) (as El Tocadisco)
Various - Brazilian Basics 4 (CD, Comp, Mixed)	Urban Essentials	 2002	
 	
Freaks (DJ Tocadisco Mix) (as DJ Tocadisco)
Various - The Annual 2004 - German Edition (2xCD, Comp, Mixed)	Polystar (3)	 2003	
 	
Nobody (Likes The Records That I Play) (TD's On The Tube Version) (as TD)
DJ Tocadisco* - Nobody (Likes The Records That I Play) (CD, Single)	Spinnin' Records	 2004	
 	
(I Just Want To Be A) Drummer (DJ Tocadisco Remix) (as El Tocadisco) and 2 more...
Heavy Rock - (I Just Want To Be A) Drummer (12")	Superstar Recordings	 2004	
 	
Freaks (DJ Tocadisco Mix) (as DJ Tocadisco)
Moguai - Freaks ◄ (4 versions)	Superstar Recordings	 2004	
 	
Bang Bang (DJ Tocadisco's and 3 more...
Toktok Und Nena* - Bang Bang ◄ (4 versions)	Superstar Recordings	 2004	
 	
(I Just Want To Be A) Drummer (DJ Tocadisco Remix) (as El Tocadisco) and 2 more...
Heavy Rock - (I Just Want To Be A) Drummer (12")	Superstar Recordings	 2004	
 	
Bang Bang (DJ Tocadisco's 'Don't Fake The Break' Mix) (as DJ Tocadisco)
Various - Kontor - Top Of The Clubs Volume 23 (2xCD, Comp, Mixed)	Polystar (3)	 2004	
 	
(I Just Want To Be) A Drummer (DJ Tocadisco Remix) (as DJ Tocadisco)
John Course & Mark Dynamix - Sessions One (2xCD, Mixed, Comp)	Ministry Of Sound (Australia)	 2004	
 	
Freaks (DJ Tocadisco Mix) (as DJ Tocadisco)
Disco Boys, The - The Disco Boys - Volume 4 (2xCD)	Kontor Records	 2004	
 	
Walking Away (Tocadisco's Acid Walk Mix) (as El Tocadisco)
Egg, The - Walking Away ◄ (13 versions)	Great Stuff Recordings	 2005	
 	
In My Arms (Tocadisco's Zwishen Den Stühlen Mix)
Erick Morillo - Subliminal Sessions Nine (3xCD, Comp, Mixed)	Subliminal	 2005	
 	
S.O.S. (Tocadisco's Tu No Me Conoces Mix) and 2 more...
A Studio Feat. Polina - S.O.S. ◄ (7 versions)

References

External links
 Official Website
 Official MySpace Page
 Discogs: Tocadisco
 Tocadisco Essential Mix

German DJs
German house musicians
Remixers
Musicians from Berlin
1974 births
Living people
Electronic dance music DJs